Marguerite de Bourbon, Lady of Albret (1344 – 1416) was a daughter of Peter I, Duke of Bourbon, and his wife Isabella of France, who was a daughter of Charles of France. Margaret was a member of the House of Bourbon.

Margaret married Arnaud Amanieu, Lord of Albret, on 30 June 1368; the marriage was the outcome of a secret treaty between Charles V of France and Arnaud Amanieu. The couple had one son, Charles d'Albret, who became Count of Dreux and Constable of France. He was killed at the Battle of Agincourt.

Ancestry

References

Sources

1344 births
1416 deaths
Margaret
Margaret
14th-century French women
14th-century French people
15th-century French women
15th-century French people